This is a list of all episodes of the television sitcom Here's Lucy, the successor to The Lucy Show. Each season ran for a total of 24 episodes.

Series overview

Episodes

Season 1 (1968–69)

Season 2 (1969–70)

Season 3 (1970–71)

Season 4 (1971–72)

Season 5 (1972–73)

Season 6 (1973–74)

See also
List of The Lucy Show episodes

Notes

References

Here's Lucy